A labyrinthectomy is a procedure used to decrease the function of the labyrinth of the inner ear. This can be done surgically or chemically. It may be done to treat Ménière's disease.

References

Ear
Diseases of inner ear
Neurological disorders